HD 38858 is a G-type star, much like The Sun, with one detected planet. The planet, designated HD 38858 b, is about twice the mass of Uranus and orbits in the star's habitable zone.

The last observation of this system for a dust disc or comet belt was in 2009 by the Spitzer Space Telescope; a belt was inferred at 102 AU. It has an inclination of 48◦.

The star exhibit a magnetic activity cycle remarkably similar to that of Sun, with the period of 10.8 years.

Planetary system
The exoplanet HD 38858 b was discovered in 2011 in orbit in its host star's habitable zone, a zone in which Earth-like conditions (namely the presence of liquid water) on a planet's surface are possible. The planet is likely a gas giant, a type of planet which astronomers believe is unlikely to support life as it is currently understood. However, the planet could have a rocky natural satellite capable of sustaining an Earth-like environment. In 2020, the issue of habitability was explored by the popular YouTube channel "Fire of Learning", in which the planet was referred to as "Kynigos", and its hypothetical satellite was compared to the Jovian Moons of Europa and Io. Potential obstacles to habitability of any natural satellite, including the eccentricity of the planet's orbit, likelihood of the moon being tidally locked, and probable prevalence of geothermic activity owed to its orbit around the gas giant, were highlighted.

The existence of planet was disputed since 2015 though, attributing the planetary signal to the frequency-domain alias of the star magnetic activity cycle, although another planet on the 198-day orbit is suspected.

References

Orion (constellation)
G-type main-sequence stars
Hypothetical planetary systems
038858
2007
027435
1085
BD-04 1244
J05483495-0405404